Chandan Roy Sanyal (born 30 January 1980) is an Indian actor who is known for his work in the Hindi and Bengali language films of India. After graduating with a degree in mathematics, he made his acting debut in the 2006 film Rang de Basanti, in a minor role. He then received critical acclaim for his supporting roles in the 2009 action film Kaminey  and in his Bengali debut, the 2010 film Mahanagar@Kolkata. Sanyal then went on to receive recognition for his performances in the 2012 Bengali drama film Aparajita Tumi and as an insomniac artist in the 2013 romantic drama Prague.

Early life
Born and brought up in Delhi, Sanyal hails from a Bengali family. Chandan studied at Raisina Bengali School and then Zakir Husain College, where he received an honors degree in Mathematics.

Career
Sanyal made his debut as Batukeshwar Dutt in 2006's Rakeysh Omprakash Mehra film Rang De Basanti but his big break came with Vishal Bhardwaj's 2009 movie Kaminey where he got a lot of appreciation from the critics as well as audience.

Chandan also did an excellent job in the latest 2012 film "Aparajita Tumi". He has been signed on as one of the two leads in the film Kaanchi.

Filmography

Films

Web series

References

External links
 
 
 

1979 births
Living people
People from Delhi
Indian male models
Bengali people
Indian male film actors
Male actors in Bengali cinema
Male actors in Hindi cinema